John Carl Kluczynski (February 15, 1896 – January 26, 1975) was a U.S. Representative from Illinois, representing the 5th district from 1951 until his death from a heart attack in Chicago, Illinois in 1975.

Early life and career
Born in Chicago, Illinois to Thomas Kluczynski and Mary Kluczynski, née Sulaski, Kluczynski attended public and parochial schools, and during the First World War served overseas as a corporal with the Eighth Field Artillery in 1918 and 1919.

He worked in the catering business upon returning to Chicago, and served in the Illinois House of Representatives from 1933 through 1948. In 1948, Kluczynski was elected to the Illinois Senate in 1948 where he served until December 1949. He resigned in 1949 to run as candidate for Congress.

Tenure in Congress

Kluczynski was elected as a Democrat to the Eighty-second Congress.
He was reelected to the twelve succeeding Congresses, and served from January 3, 1951, until his death from a heart attack January 26, 1975, in Chicago.

He voted in favor of the Civil Rights Act of 1957.

While in Congress, he served as chairman of the Public Works subcommittee on transportation.

He was interred in Resurrection Mausoleum, Justice, Illinois.

Legacy
The office building at the Chicago Federal Center, known as the Kluczynski Federal Building, was named in Kluczynski's honor after his death in 1975.

He was a Polish-American, active in the life of his community as a member of the Polish National Alliance and Polish Roman Catholic Union of America.

See also
 List of United States Congress members who died in office (1950–99)

References

1896 births
1975 deaths
Politicians from Chicago
Military personnel from Illinois
Democratic Party members of the Illinois House of Representatives
Democratic Party Illinois state senators
Democratic Party members of the United States House of Representatives from Illinois
American politicians of Polish descent
United States Army soldiers
20th-century American politicians